The Seamen's Bethel (or Seaman's Bethel) is a chapel in New Bedford, Massachusetts, United States, located at 15 Johnny Cake Hill.

History
Built by the New Bedford Port Society, it was completed on May 2, 1832. It is a contributing property to the New Bedford Historic District, a National Historic Landmark.

The Seamen's Bethel was specifically constructed for the many sailors who called New Bedford their home port (mostly whalers), who considered it a matter of tradition that one visited the chapel before setting sail.

Some changes were made when the structure was repaired after a fire in 1866. The names of New Bedford whalers killed, and later all area fishermen, are noted on the walls of the Bethel. 

James Henry Gooding, a war correspondent and member of the 54th Massachusetts Infantry Regiment during the Civil War, married Ellen Louisa Allen in the Bethel in the summer of 1862.

In 1996 the Seamen's Bethel, along with the New Bedford Whaling Museum (located across the street), the historic district and other icons of New Bedford whaling were collectively made into the New Bedford Whaling National Historical Park.

Moby-Dick
In 1851, Herman Melville published Moby-Dick, his famous tale of the white whale. The Bethel was immortalized in the book as the "Whaleman's Chapel". Melville wrote:

In the novel, a nautically-themed sermon is given from a bow-shaped pulpit by a chaplain named Father Mapple. The character is generally believed to be inspired by Father Edward Thompson Taylor, who Melville likely heard preaching in Boston. However, he was likely also inspired to create the character after hearing Enoch Mudge preaching at the Seamen's Bethel on December 27, 1840, while in New Bedford awaiting his own departure on a whaling vessel. 

The pulpit shaped like the bow of a ship in the novel was a Melville invention, but a replica of the one described in the book was added to the chapel in 1961 by Robert Baker, boat builder and naval architect from Westport, MA. Also noted is the pew that Melville sat in when he visited in 1840.

After the book's publication, the Seamen's Bethel came to be widely seen as a symbol of the whalers, and later as a symbol of their history.

In film
Shots of Seamen's Bethel appear in the 1922 film Down to the Sea in Ships. In 1956, John Huston shot a scene from the movie adaptation of Moby-Dick (with Gregory Peck and Orson Welles), in front of the real Seamen's Bethel, but interior shots in the movie were not shot on-location. This revitalized tourism to the area.

Images

References

External links

 New Bedford Port Society

Churches completed in 1832
Churches in New Bedford, Massachusetts
Chapels in the United States
Moby-Dick
Whaling
New Bedford Whaling National Historical Park
1832 establishments in the United States
Historic district contributing properties in Massachusetts
History of Bristol County, Massachusetts
Properties of religious function on the National Register of Historic Places in Massachusetts
National Register of Historic Places in New Bedford, Massachusetts